A section house is a building or house-like structure located near or next to a section of railroad used for housing railroad workers, or for the storing and maintenance of equipment for a section of railroad. Section houses were used mainly from the 1890s to the 1960s. By the 1970s, section houses were being slowly phased out. In Canada section houses were usually located right across from the railway station.

Examples

United States
Alaska
 Potter Section House, Potter, Alaska, now housing a small museum with a rotary snow plow and crew cars, located south of Anchorage, Alaska.
 Whitney Section House, built in 1917 in Wasilla, Alaska.

Arizona
 Benson Section House, built by Southern Pacific Railroad in 1880s–'90s in Benson, Arizona.
 Elgin Section House, Elgin, Arizona, built for the now-abandoned Benson-to-Nogales mainline of the New Mexico & Arizona Railroad (later Southern Pacific).
 Patagonia Railroad Section Foreman Residence, built next to the Patagonia Depot in 1904 by New Mexico & Arizona Railroad and moved to its present location in Patagonia, Arizona in 1964.
 Skull Valley Section House, built in the 1920s in Skull Valley, Arizona.
 Wickenburg Section House, built by Atchison, Topeka and Santa Fe Railway in 1925 in Wickenburg, Arizona.

Kansas
 Kansas Pacific Railway Section House, an 1879 stone railroad superintendent's residence, one of only two remaining Kansas Pacific Railroad structures. Wallace, Kansas.

Oregon
 Maupin Section Foreman's House, built in 1910 in Maupin, Oregon. Now used as museum commemorating the Deschutes Railroad War

South Carolina
 Little Mountain Section House in Little Mountain, built in 1890 by the Columbia, Newberry and Laurens Railroad

Gallery

See also
 Train station

External links
True Tales from a CPR Section House

Railway buildings and structures
Canadian architectural styles
American architectural styles